Yevhen Ihorovych Zadoya (born 5 January 1991) is a Ukrainian professional football midfielder who plays for Chornomorets Odesa.

Career
Zadoya is a product of the FC Metalurh Zaporizhzhia football academy. After being promoted out of the club's academy in 2007, for a long time played he played for the club's reserve and under-21 teams.

In 2011 Zadoya was loaned away to one of the Kharkiv teams playing in Persha Liha and since then continues to play in that league. In a summer of 2016 he was listed for few games as a player of NK Veres Rivne, but never actually played a single minute for the club. After that transferred to FC Kolos Kovalivka.

References

External links
 
 
 

1991 births
Living people
Footballers from Zaporizhzhia
Ukrainian footballers
FC Metalurh Zaporizhzhia players
FC Metalurh-2 Zaporizhzhia players
FC Kolos Kovalivka players
FC Helios Kharkiv players
Ukrainian Premier League players
Ukrainian First League players
Ukrainian Second League players
Association football midfielders
Ukraine youth international footballers